Orphans of Apollo is a 2008 documentary film directed and produced by Michael Potter, co-directed by Becky Neiman and edited by Todd Jones, which describes how a band of entrepreneurs tried to privatize the space station Mir and tells the story that led to the development of MirCorp. It features prominent NewSpace entrepreneurs  and space advocates (Rick Tumlinson, Jeffrey Manber), backed financially by Walter Anderson.

Background
MirCorp founder Walt Anderson’s highest-profile venture was an audacious plan to take over the Russian space station Mir—which was being abandoned by the Russian space agency—and turn it into a commercial outpost in orbit. That effort ultimately failed. The film’s title refers to those people who came of age during the early years of the Space Age and expected to see progress continue at the rate seen in those heady early days, only to be disappointed—orphaned—by events of the last few decades. If they were going to have the kind of bold future they once envisioned, they would have to build it themselves. And, with MirCorp, that’s what they tried to do. In honor of the 50th anniversary of the Smithsonian Institution, an exclusive screening of Orphans of Apollo was shown in the National Air and Space Museum’s Lockheed Martin IMAX Theater.

Synopsis
Orphans of Apollo is a documentary film based on a group of entrepreneurs heading MirCorp, who negotiate a business deal with the Russian government to lease the Mir space station for commercial use. The film covers the historical period from the time of President Nixon’s decision to end the NASA Apollo Moon program to post-Soviet Russia. More than solely a high-tech space story, the film includes themes of international negotiation, the power of entrepreneur vision, failed effort, and of course political power play. The film combines archival Russian film footage, archival NASA film footage, and IMAX footage, with interviews and original footage of the major players in the project including Walt Anderson, Richard Branson, Tom Clancy, Jeffrey Manber, Rick Tumlinson and others. The documentary has sufficient action to move it along quickly.

Michael Potter
As of 2008, Michael Potter was a Senior Fellow at the International Institute of Space Commerce. Previously, Potter worked as an international telecommunications analyst at the Center for Strategic and International Studies (CSIS) in Washington, D.C. Potter was one of the founders of Esprit Telecom, a successful European telecommunications company, where he was president until leaving to establish Paradigm Ventures, a high-technology venture capital firm. Potter was also a founding member of the European Competitive Telecommunications Association (ECTA). The ECTA pushed for deregulation of telecommunications markets across Europe as a result of commercial practices by former monopolies to limit activities by resellers to access networks and obtain low pricing for the new operators.

Accolades
Winner of the Space Frontier Foundation’s Vision of the Future 2008 award

See also

 Black Sky: The Race For Space, 2005 documentary about NewSpace venture

References

External links

Documentary films about outer space
Space tourism
Human spaceflight
Commercial spaceflight
Mir
2008 films
2000s English-language films